Bitter Grace is a Manhattan goth rock band active since around 1985. Formed by Gustavo Lapis Ahumad in New York City, the band is known for their live set that includes lighting, smoke and theatrical effects. Plagued with consistent line-up changes over the past two decades, the band still plays throughout Manhattan with the current line-up of Gustavo Lapis Ahumad (vocals/guitar), Pay-Dro (drums), Marcus Pan (bass/backing vocals) and Brandon (guitar).

Bitter Grace has played numerous clubs, but concentrate mostly in Manhattan where they are located. They've taken the stage at CBGB, the Gallery, Club Rare, Downtime and Rothko's in recent years.

History
Bitter Grace was formed by Gustavo Lapis Ahumad in 1985 and almost immediately began playing live throughout New York City. The line-up of the band was constantly evolving and for reasons like this it took over ten years for the first album, God and the Abyss, to finally be released and distributed by Middle Pillar Presents. The album itself was touched by numerous hands, with multiple drummers, bassists and guitarists being involved until its mastering and release.

Recent
The current line-up has changed already over the past year with Thad Jasonis leaving to join New Vile System in Queens, New York City. He was replaced by the returning Brandon who played guitar on the recordings of Shimmer prior to leaving the state. This new album, another seven years in the making, is due to be released in the early reaches of 2006. Previously released singles from the album, "Shimmering" and "Slave", have achieved college air play and Internet radio play in the summer of 2005 when they were officially released. The 2005 live shows found Bitter Grace playing throughout Manhattan prior to the release of the new album.

On September 18, 2008, the band announced on their MySpace that Shimmer will be released early 2009, and they are currently working on the third album entitled Critical.

Evolution
The release of "Slave" and "Shimmering" have shown that Bitter Grace have laced an industrial and EBM style into their previous post-punk goth rock style on God and the Abyss. Live sets have started to incorporate more lighting and shadow textures for a highly theatrical affect opposed to previous garage-style shows done in the early years.

Discography

Studio albums
God and the Abyss - 1997
Shimmer - 2005
The Burning Sun - 2012

Further information
Official Bitter Grace Site
Bitter Grace on MySpace

Musical groups from New York City
American gothic rock groups
Musical groups established in 1985
1985 establishments in New York City